Nilakkal, also spelled Nilackal, or formerly Chayal, is a remote ghat region located in the Goodrical range of Ranni forest division in Pathanamthitta District in the Indian state of Kerala.Nearest Railway Station Is Thiruvalla,Located At A Distance Of 71 km. The place is noted mainly as an edathavalam or halting-place for the Ayyappa devotees during Sabarimala pilgrimage. Administratively, it falls under the Perunad grama panchayath in Ranni tehsil.

Etymology 
According to some historical records, the name Nilakkal is associated with Nilavaaya, considered to be the presiding deity of old Shasta temple (present Sabarimala) at the forest interiors. While some other records has it that the name Nilakkal came from "Nilakkal thavalam".
The place's alternate name Chayal denotes a place sloping towards Pamba river. But in another context, Chayal is referred to someone who is left alone.

History 

The historical background of Nilakkal was based on its geographical position which date backs to the ancient times. Kerala had age-long trade relations with Pandiyas and Cholas through a trade route passed through Nilakkal. It was a well established populous trade center during the first century AD, primarily exporting spices such as cinnamon, ginger, pepper and forest products like timber and ivory. The place at that time was commonly known as Nilakkal thavalam and it was connected to ports like Muziris (present Kodungalloor) and Purakkad. Merchants who traveled with their trade items had a sojourn at the thavalam. In the later stages, the region came under the possession of Vel kings of Ay kingdom (later became Venad).

Religion

Places of Hindu worship

Sree Mahadeva temple 

The old shrine at Nilakkal is currently administered by Travancore devaswom board (TDB). During Sabarimala pilgrimage, many pilgrims visit the temple to have a sojourn and worship. On this occasion, Nilakkal will be crowded by a large number of pilgrims. The temple was built in 1946. It is located just 1 km from the main highway that leads to Sabarimala. Lord Shiva is the presiding deity and he is believed to be in two moods, Ugramoorthy (fierce) and Mangala pradayakan (auspicious). A common belief is that Lord Shiva is showering his blessings to his son Lord Ayyappa to fight against all evil spirits while throwing all anger to the evils. There are only two Upa Prathishtas (sub-deities) here, Lord Kannimoola Ganapathi and Nandi. Three Poojas are held here daily. Special weekly days are Sunday, Monday and Friday. The Maha Shivaratri held annually is one of the noted festivals of the temple.

Palliyarakkavu Devi temple 
It is situated near the Shiva temple. Devi presides here, who is considered as the Mother of Lord Ayyappa. Pilgrims make offerings to Devi for welfare and sake. The Irumudi kettu nirakkal (a ritual related to Sabarimala pilgrimage) is performed here by the pilgrims after the Nayattu vili (a narrative song). Three poojas are held every day. Aravana payasam is the main offering to Devi.

Sabarimala  
The famous Hindu pilgrim destination, Sabarimala is only at a distance of 23 km from here. Nilakkal is an unavoidable place during the times of pilgrimages. All the vehicles to Sabarimala passes through Nilakkal which is on the state highway 67.

Christianity

St. Thomas ecumenical church 

Saint Thomas, who was an apostle of Jesus Christ established Seven and Half Churches in Kerala which was famed as Ezharappallikal. St. Thomas Ecumenical Church near Angamoozhy is one of them. It is referred as  'Arappally' or half-church. The church is an example of the unity of the Christian churches and also of the communal harmony. The church trust proved that unity among the churches can be maintained and at the same time give respect to the sentiments of the faiths of other religions. The main message which the church provides is of 'love, peace and fraternity'. This church has the importance that it is the first Ecumenical church in the world and has been dedicated by all the denominations as an example of heritage by St. Thomas. The church is located in the interior part of the Sabarimala hills, while all the other churches built by St. Thomas are near to the coastal areas viz. Kokkamangalam, Paravoor, Palayoor, Thiruvithamkode. Even though there is no historical evidence of the missionary work of St. Thomas in Nilakkal, some assumptions of his establishment of a church in this place is written in old metal plates and other historian writings. Since the old church is in a dilapidated stage, a new church has been constructed in a site not far from it.

Catholic titular see 
The Nazrani diocese was nominally restored in 1977 as Syro-Malankara Catholic Church (Eastern Catholic, an Antiochian Rite) Titular bishopric of Chayal (Italian) / Chaialum / Chaialen(sis) (Latin), of the lowest (Episcopal) rank. It is vacant, having had the following incumbents :
 Paulos Philoxinos Ayyamkulangara (1977.10.11 – death 1998.11.03), as Auxiliary Bishop of the Metropolitanate Trivandrum of the Syro-Malankars (India) (1977.10.11 – 1998.11.03)
 Baselios Cleemis Thottunkal (2001.06.18 – 2003.09.11) as Auxiliary Bishop of above Trivandrum of the Syro-Malankars (India) (2001.06.18 – 2003.09.11), Apostolic Visitator in North America of the Syro-Malankars (2001.06.18 – 2003.09.11) and Apostolic Visitator in Europe of the Syro-Malankars (2001.06.18 – 2003.09.11); later last suffragan Eparch (Bishop) of Tiruvalla of the Syro-Malankars (India) (2003.09.11 – 2006.05.15), (see) promoted Metropolitan Archbishop of Tiruvalla of the Syro-Malankars (India) (2006.05.15 – 2007.02.10), Major Archbishop of Trivandrum of the Syro-Malankars (India) ([2007.02.08] 2007.02.10 – ...), President of Synod of the Syro-Malankarese Church (2007.02.10 – ...), Second Vice-President of Catholic Bishops’ Conference of India (2008.02.19 – 2010.03.01), Vice-President of Catholic Bishops’ Conference of India (2010.03.01 – 2014.02.12), Cardinal-Priest of S. Gregorio VII (2012.11.24 [2013.05.19] – ...), President of Catholic Bishops’ Conference of India (2014.02.12 – ...)

The Orthodox diocese of Nilakkal 
Nilakkal diocese was formed on 15 August 2010, by the order issued by H.H Baselios Mar Thoma Didymos I, the Catholicos cum Malankara Metropolitan. The first metropolitan of the diocese is H.G.Dr Joshua Mar Nicodimos. This newly formed diocese, comprising Kottayam and Pathanamthitta districts, has 39 parishes including almost 2953 families. These parishes are organised into five ecclesiastical districts : Ayroor, Vayalathala, Ranni, Nilakkal and Kanakappaalam. The diocese has its headquarters at Ranni, named St. Thomas aramana, and also engages in charitable activities such as helping the poor and needy in and around the diocese.

Places of interest 
Attathodu Tribal Colony: A remote tribal settlement is situated near Nilakkal named Attathodu, on the banks of river Pamba. Majority of the tribals here belongs to Malapandaram (hill pandaram) community, commonly seen in the sacred forests of Sabarimala. People here engages in small scale agriculture and relays on the forest products.

Kakki Reservoir: Kakki reservoir is located 45 km east to Nilakkal. This dam was built as a part of Sabarigiri hydro-electric project, the second largest hydro-electric project in Kerala. This dam is situated very close to the western ghats and also it is a tourist spot.

Periyar Tiger Reserve: Periyar tiger reserve lies in northern part of Nilakkal. It spreads over an area of about 925 km² and is one of the 48 tiger reserves in India.

Agriculture 
Rubber is cultivated in the gentle undulating lands and in plains with favorable geographical settings making its cultivation easier. As part of improving the parking facilities, a number of years tapped rubber trees were cut out. Sabari estate of Farming corporation is an important estate here. The land available for cultivation around Nilakkal is comparatively less hence most parts are covered by dense reserve forests. But the historical records points out that Nilakkal in ancient times was an important commercial center exporting several spices and forest products like timber and ivory. Later, it was covered by thick forests.

Geography 

Predominately it is a remote hilly area classified as Malanad (geographic division of Kerala) totally surrounded by dense reserve forests and small scale rubber plantations. A sizeable portion is covered by thick reserve forests of Western Ghats mountain ranges and rubber plantations. The holy river Pamba, flows westward through the northern part of Nilakkal and finally merges with Vembanadu Lake.

Location 
Nilakkal lies in the eastern part of Pathanamthitta district and west to Sabarimala near the Western Ghats forests. It is located on the main trunk road leading to Sabarimala temple. Chittar (27 km) and Angamoozhy (7 km) are the nearby townships.

Nearby places 
 Angamoozhy
 Plappally
 Attathodu
 Chalakkayam
 Elavumkal
 Aryattukavala
 Rajampara
 Seethathodu
 Chittar
 Thulappally
 Naranamthodu

Climate 

Nilakkal's climate is classified under Köppen climate classification. It is also one of the five upstream rain gauge stations of Pamba river basin which receives a significant rainfall of over  during the South-West Monsoon of last few years. But the amount of precipitation is comparatively low during the North-East Monsoon, Pre-Monsoon and Non-Monsoon period, with only  of precipitation.

Sufficient amount of rainfall is received during the months of June, July, August and September. Although Humidity increases during the months of March and April, a pleasant climate is normally experienced. The best weather is normally from October to February. Winter begins from the month of December to mid-February. Since Nilakkal and its surroundings are in the middle of thick forests, locally developed thundershowers are common here.

Infrastructure

Nilakkal base camp
Nilakkal developed into a main base camp of Sabarimala pilgrimage and achieved huge progress by the initiation of Sabarimala master plan by Travancore Devaswom Board. In 2005, the Government gave  of land to Devaswom board to improve the basic infrastructures and parking facilities for pilgrims at Nilakkal. Previously, the land was under the possession of the Government-owned State Farming Corporation since 1982. Before 1982, the area was used for cultivating sugarcane by the co-operative Mannam Sugar Mills, Pandalam. The land occupied from Farming corporation was mostly utilized for improving parking facilities.

At times of Sabarimala pilgrimage, heavy and medium vehicles drops pilgrims at Pamba and parks at Nilakkal in order to avoid the rush at Pamba. The parking grounds at Nilakkal could accommodate more than 4000 vehicles at one time. The parking has been divided into various sectors for the convenience of pilgrims from various states. Recently, Devaswom board also improved the drinking water and sanitation facilities at the camp. A nadapanthal (shed) is constructed in front of the Mahadeva temple for the pilgrims. The base camp also have a police station, Government primary health centre, KSRTC bus stand and accommodation facilities for the pilgrims.

Health and education
The nearest medical centre to Nilakkal is the Government Primary Health Centre started on 19 January 2014, by Dr.Prasob Enose, which functions throughout the year, benefiting tribal families in Attathodu colony.

Nearby hospitals
 Govt. primary Health Centre, Angamoozhy
 Govt. Ayurveda Hospital, Thulappally
 Govt. Hospital, Pamba
 Athura Hospital,  Seethathodu

Educational institutions
 Government Tribal H.S.S, Kissumam
 S.A.V.H.S, Angamoozhy
 Government Tribal L.P School, Attathodu
 K.R.P.M Higher Secondary School, Seethathodu
 Govt. Higher Decondary School, Chittar
 V. K. N. M Vocational Higher Secondary School, Vayyattupuzha

Transportation

Road
Nilakkal lies on the Mannarakkulanji - Chalakkayam state highway (SH-67). During Sabarimala pilgrimage, state-owned K.S.R.T.C buses provides chain services from Pamba to Nilakkal for the pilgrims. Private busses only operates through nearby places like Angamoozhy and Thulappally. Still transportation  is comparatively less in the region.

Railway
The nearest railway stations are Chengannur (68 km) and Thiruvalla (73 km).

Airport
Cochin International Airport (136 km) and Thiruvananthapuram international airport (156 km) are the nearest airports to Nilakkal. There is also a heliport at Perunad, near Nilakkal, which operates at times of Sabarimala pilgrimage. A helipad is constructed at Nilakkal base camp as part of the disaster management and to deal with emergency situations.

See also 
 Sabarimala
 Pathanamthitta district
 Nilakkal Sree Mahadeva Temple

References 

Villages in Pathanamthitta district